Cascone is an Italian surname, which originated as an augmented form of Casco; it means "large helmet". It is also found in Malta. People with this surname include:

Gioacchino Cascone (born 1972), Italian rower
Kim Cascone (born 1955), American electronic music composer
Annette Cascone, 1980s and 1990s American author and screenwriter
Gina Cascone, 1980s and 1990s American author and screenwriter

References

Italian-language surnames